Omandur or Ommandur is a village in Tindivanam taluk of Villupuram district, Tamil Nadu.

Demographics 

 census, Omandur had a population of 2594 with 1308 males and 1286 females.

References 

http://www.censusindia.gov.in/pca/SearchDetails.aspx?Id=683547

Villages in Viluppuram district